Richmond Public Library (RPL) is a public library that serves Richmond, British Columbia, Canada. The library has four branches in the city: Brighouse (Main), Steveston, Ironwood, and Cambie. RPL also offers weekly outreach service to the Hamilton neighbourhood.

The library has won numerous awards, including the John Cotton Dana Public Relations Award in 2008 for its "Ralphy" library card for kids.

In September 2018, Richmond Public Library placed a book dispensing machine in the Hamilton Community Centre, allowing nearby residents to access the library's collection.

Services
The Richmond Public Libraries offer a variety of services, such as:
Books, DVDs, music CDs, video games in a variety of languages for children and adults
E-books and audio books offered through Libby a free app on iOS and Android by OverDrive, Inc.
Computer and Internet Workstations (MSWindows, Web browsing, MSOffice, Basic accessory application-programs)
More than 5000 movies and TV shows
A silent study room and reading area
iPads for kids (at Brighouse Branch), reservation needed
Various programs for children and adults, including storytimes, ESL conversation circles, cultural festivals and presentations on a wide variety of topics.

The Launchpad 
The Launchpad, which was established earlier in 2014, is a new feature in the Brighouse (main) branch. 3D printers, digital creation stations and scanners are provided. Library users have the opportunity to order small toys which cost two dollars. The toys will be made fresh using the three 3D printers available. Some of the selections are: Humanoids, tanks, and dinosaur key chains. Members who order will get a ticket, which they will give to the library information desk at the booked time.

References

 

Public libraries in British Columbia
Richmond, British Columbia
Libraries established in 1975
1975 establishments in Canada